Slabbert is a surname of Middle Dutch origin. Notable people with the surname include:

Deon Slabbert (born 2000), South African rugby union player
Dihan Slabbert (born 1982), South African singer, performer, composer, producer, musician, and songwriter
Frederik van Zyl Slabbert (1940-2010), South African political analyst, businessman, and politician
Marcelle Slabbert, South African rugby league player

See also
Ex parte Slabbert, an important case in South African insolvency law